Raymond Roberts Ross (20 April 1903 – 23 June 1981) was an Australian rules footballer who played with Richmond and St Kilda in the Victorian Football League (VFL).

Death
He died (suddenly) at Broadford, Victoria on 23 June 1981.

Notes

References
 Hogan P: The Tigers Of Old, Richmond FC, (Melbourne), 1996.

External links 

1903 births
1981 deaths
Australian rules footballers from Victoria (Australia)
Richmond Football Club players
St Kilda Football Club players